Coriaria pottsiana, commonly called the Hikurangi tutu or Pott's tutu, is a rare low-growing sub-alpine perennial summer-green shrub, only known to exist on a small grassy scree slope behind the tramping hut on Mount Hikurangi in the Gisborne Region of New Zealand's North Island.

Description
It is rhizomatous, with slender four-sided  stems growing from its slender rhizomes.

Like all Coriaria species, the plant is poisonous, especially the seed inside the small black berries. However, the juice of some Coriaria berries is not poisonous, and was used by Māori, who called members of the genus "tutu".

References

External links
 Coriaria pottsiana on the website of the NZ Plant Conservation Network (with photos)
 Coriaria pottsiana on Oratia Native Plant Nursery's website (with photo)
 Coriaria pottsiana W.R.B.Oliv. (1942) in the Ngā Tipu o Aotearoa – Plants of New Zealand database
 Specimen (holotype) at Te Papa
 Taxonomical description in the Flora of New Zealand series

Coriariaceae
Flora of the North Island
Taxa named by Walter Oliver